Sangeen Wali Khan (June 7, 1959 – June 28, 2008) was a politician in Pakistan. He was son of Abdul Wali Khan and Nasim Wali Khan, and the half brother of Asfandyar Wali Khan, leader of Awami National Party. Sangeen Wali Khan was contender for Senate seat from Khyber-Pakhtunkhwa with a ticket from Awami National Party, in May 2008.
Khan contested his last election and was defeated by Saeed Muhammad Khan son of Lala Nisar Muhammad Khan.

Khan died on 25 June 2008 at the age of 49. He was suffering from liver cancer and died at the Shaukat Khanum Hospital, Lahore. He left behind a widow, son (Lawangeen Wali Khan) and two daughters.

See also 
 Khan Abdul Bahram Khan
 Khan Abdul Jabbar Khan
 Abdul Ghaffar Khan
 Abdul Ghani Khan
 Abdul Wali Khan
 Nasim Wali Khan
 Asfandyar Wali Khan
 Bahram Khan Family
 Awami National Party

References

1959 births
2008 deaths
Pashtun people
Awami National Party politicians
Sangeen Wali